John Dankosky (August 14) is a radio journalist and moderator, who is currently Director of News and Audio for the public radio program Science Friday. During a 25-year career at Connecticut Public Radio he founded the PRNDI award-winning program, Where We Live.

Biography

Originally from Pittsburgh, Dankosky is a veteran public radio broadcaster, who began his career in 1988 at WDUQ. After moving to Connecticut in 1994, Dankosky founded the daily talk show Where We Live and co-founded the New England News Collaborative. He has also reported for National Public Radio, worked on the collaborative public radio project America Amplified and has edited award-winning documentaries on Connecticut history, 9/11, and the mental health of children. He currently hosts the podcasts Steady Habits and Untold for the online news organization The Connecticut Mirror, and serves as fill-in host on Science Friday. He is a frequent moderator for The Connecticut Forum. Dankosky has worked as a journalism professor at Quinnipiac University and Central Connecticut State University, where he served as the first Robert C. Vance Endowed Chair in Journalism.

References

American radio personalities
Living people
Year of birth missing (living people)